Crawford is a surname and a given name of English and Scottish origins.

Origin
The surname Crawford originates from a locative name, possibly derived from a place name composed of the Old English elements crāwe, Scots Craw ("crow") and ford ("ford"). Examples of such place names include: Crawford, South Lanarkshire, Scotland, Crawford, Dorset, England, and Crawford, Lancashire, England. The surname is most probably derived from the Scottish place name. In some cases, the surname may be a variant of Crowfoot, a surname derived from a nickname.

The surname Crawford corresponds to the Scottish Gaelic MacCreamhain, and the Irish de Cráfort, Mac Crábhagáin, and Mac Raith.
  
Early examples of forms of the surname include: John de Crauford, in 1147–1160 (Scotland), Galfridus de Crauford, in 1188–1202 (Scotland), and Nicolaus de Crauford, in 1205 (England).

The given name Crawford, generally a masculine name, is derived from the surname.

Distribution

As a surname, Crawford is the 289th most common name in Great Britain, with 30,292 bearers. It is most common in South Lanarkshire where it is the 5th most common surname with 3,384 bearers and in Highland where it is the 8th most common surname with 3,394 bearers. Other concentrations include Belfast (25th, 3,328), Greater Manchester (58th, 3,378), Lancashire (327th, 1,852), West Midlands (341st, 1,796) and Essex (374th, 1,722), and Yorkshire. The countries with the highest percentages of Crawford families are Canada, Jamaica, Northern Ireland, and Scotland.

People with the surname Crawford

A
Aaron Crawford (disambiguation), multiple people
Adair Crawford (1748–1795), English chemist and physician
Alan Crawford (disambiguation), multiple people
Alastair Crawford, English internet entrepreneur
Alex Crawford (born 1962), British journalist
Alexander Crawford (disambiguation), multiple people
Ali Crawford (born 1991), Scottish footballer
Alice Arnold Crawford (1850–1874), American poet
Allen Crawford (born 1968), American illustrator
Amanda Crawford (disambiguation), multiple people
Amy Crawford (disambiguation), multiple people
Andrea Crawford (born 1985), Canadian curler
Andrew Crawford (disambiguation), multiple people
Anne Crawford (1920–1956), British actress
Anthony Crawford (disambiguation), multiple people
Arron Crawford (born 1983), Australian cricketer
Arthur Crawford (1835–1911), British civil servant
Arthur Crawford (politician) (1923–1995), Australian politician

B
Bertha May Crawford (1886–1937), Canadian singer
Beverly Crawford (born 1963), American vocalist
Bill Crawford (disambiguation), multiple people
Billy Crawford (born 1982), American-Filipino singer
Bob Crawford (disambiguation), multiple people
Bobby Crawford (ice hockey) (born 1960), American ice hockey player
Bobby Crawford (footballer) (1901–1965), Scottish footballer
Brad Crawford (disambiguation), multiple people
Brandon Crawford (born 1987), American baseball player
Brendan Crawford (born 1990), American football player
Brian Crawford (disambiguation), multiple people
Broderick Crawford (1911–1986), American actor
Bruce Crawford (born 1955), Scottish politician
Bryan Crawford (born 1982), Canadian football player
Bryant Crawford (born 1997), American basketball player
Bryce Crawford (1914–2011), American scientist
Byron Crawford, American television journalist

C
Callum Crawford (born 1984), Canadian lacrosse player
Cam Crawford (born 1988), Australian rugby union footballer
Candace Crawford (born 1994), Canadian skier
Candice Crawford (born 1986), American beauty queen
Carl Crawford (born 1981), American baseball player
Carl Crawford (boxer) (1935–1999), Guyanese boxer
Carlos Crawford (born 1971), American baseball player
Carol Crawford (1934–1982), American backgammon and bridge player
Carol A. Gotway Crawford, American statistician
Carole Crawford (born 1943), Jamaican model
Carolin Crawford (born 1963), British astronomer
Caroline Crawford (born 1949), American singer
Carolyn Crawford (born 1970), American politician
Casey Crawford (born 1987), American basketball player
Casey Crawford (American football) (born 1977), American football player
Chace Crawford (born 1985), American actor
Chad Crawford, American television presenter
Chandra Crawford (born 1983), Canadian skier
Charles Crawford (disambiguation), multiple people
Chase Crawford (born 1996), American actor
Cheryl Crawford (1902–1986), American theatre producer
Chris Crawford (disambiguation), multiple people 
Christina Crawford (born 1939), American writer and actress
Christina Crawford (wrestler) (born 1988), American professional wrestler
Cindy Crawford (born 1966), American model
Clayne Crawford (born 1978), American actor
Coe I. Crawford (1858–1944), American attorney
Col Crawford (1913–2007), Australian rules footballer
Coleman Crawford, American basketball coach
Colin Crawford (born 1958), American academic
Corey Crawford (born 1984), Canadian ice hockey player
Corey Crawford (American football) (born 1991), American football player
Coutts Crawford (1817–1889), English naval officer
Craig Crawford (born 1956), American journalist
Craig Crawford (politician) (born 1970), Australian politician
Cynthia Crawford, British politician
Cyril Crawford (1902–1988), New Zealand cricketer

D
Damion Crawford (born 1980), Jamaican politician
Dan Crawford (1870–1925), Scottish missionary
Dana Hudkins Crawford (born 1931), American conservationist
Danny Crawford (born 1953), American basketball referee
Danny Crawford (politician) (born 1950), American politician
Dave Crawford (coach) (1889–1974), American football and basketball coach
Dave Crawford (musician) (1943–1988), American musician
David Crawford (disambiguation), multiple people
Dean Crawford (born 1958), Canadian rower
Dean Crawford (author), British author
Demetrius Crawford (born 1986), American football player
Denny Crawford (1921–2005), American football player
Derrick Crawford (disambiguation), multiple people
Dick Crawford (born 1933), American politician
Dirom Grey Crawford (1857–1942), British physician
Donald Crawford (1837–1919), Scottish politician
Dorothy Crawford (1911-1988), Australian actress
Dorothy H. Crawford, Scottish professor
Doug Crawford, Canadian neuroscientist
Douglas Crawford (1939–2002), Scottish politician
Drew Crawford (born 1990), American basketball player

E
Ed Crawford (born 1964), American singer
Ed Crawford (American football) (1934–2017), American football player
Edmund Crawford (1906–1977), English footballer
Edmund Thornton Crawford (1806–1885), Scottish painter
Edward Crawford (disambiguation), multiple people
Edwin L. Crawford (1925–1993), American politician
Elbert Crawford (born 1966), American football player
Elizabeth Crawford (born 1959), American painter
Elizabeth Crawford (historian), British suffrage researcher
Ella D. Crawford (1852–1932), American temperance movement organizer
Ellen Crawford (born 1951), American actress
Emily Crawford (1841–1915), Irish journalist
Emma Crawford (1858–1939), Australian teacher
Emmet Crawford (1844–1886), American soldier
Ernest Crawford (1897–1956), American bassist
Ernie Crawford (1891–1959), Irish rugby union footballer
Ewan Crawford (born 1941), Australian judge

F
Fergus Crawford (1933–1985), Irish footballer
Fiona Crawford (born 1977), Australian softball player
Florence Crawford (1880–1954), American actress
Floyd Crawford (1928–2017), Canadian ice hockey player
F. M. Crawford (1883–1953), American basketball coach
Forrest Crawford (1881–1908), American baseball player
F. S. Crawford (1829–1890), Australian lithographer
Francis Crawford (disambiguation), multiple people
Frank Crawford (disambiguation), multiple people
Fred Crawford (disambiguation), multiple people
Freddie Crawford (born 1941), American basketball player

G
Garry Crawford (born 1972), British sociologist
Gary Crawford (disambiguation), multiple people
Gavin Crawford (born 1971), Canadian comedian
Gavin Crawford (footballer) (1869–1955), Scottish footballer
Geoffrey Crawford (rower) (1904–1942), English rower
Geoffrey W. Crawford (born 1954), American judge
George Crawford (disambiguation), multiple people
Gertrude Crawford (1868–1937), British munitions worker
Gina Crawford (born 1980), New Zealand triathlete
Ginnie Crawford (born 1983), American track and field athlete
Glenn Crawford (1913–1972), American baseball player
Grace Inez Crawford (1889–1977), American singer
Graeme Crawford (born 1947), Scottish footballer
Graham Crawford (born 1967), English cricketer
Grey Crawford (born 1951), American artist

H
Hank Crawford (1934–2009), American saxophonist
Harold Crawford (disambiguation), multiple people
Harry Crawford (disambiguation), multiple people
Hasely Crawford (born 1950), track-and-field athlete
Hayley Crawford (born 1984), Australian footballer
Heather Ammons Crawford, American politician
Hector Crawford (1913–1991), Australian radio producer
Henry Crawford (disambiguation), multiple people
Herbert Crawford (1878–1946), Canadian politician
Hilton Crawford (1945–2014), American football player
Holly Crawford (born 1984), Australian snowboarder
Homewood Crawford (1850–1936), English solicitor
Howard Crawford (1892–1959), Canadian sports journalist
H. R. Crawford (1939–2017), American politician and developer
Hubert Crawford, American baseball player
Hubert H. Crawford (1910–1985), American painter
Hugh Crawford (disambiguation), multiple people

I
Ian Crawford (disambiguation), multiple people
Ilse Crawford (born 1962), British designer
Inez Mabel Crawford (1869–1938), American socialite
Isabella Valancy Crawford (1850–1887), Canadian poet
Isiaah Crawford (born 1960), American academic administrator

J
Jack Crawford (disambiguation), multiple people
Jackie Crawford (1896–1975), English footballer
Jackson Crawford (born 1985), American scholar
Jak Crawford (born 2005), American racing driver
Jamal Crawford (born 1980), American basketball player
James Crawford (disambiguation), multiple people
Jan Crawford (born 1965), American journalist
Janna Crawford, American Paralympic basketball player
Jay Crawford (born 1965), American sports journalist
Jen Crawford (born 1964), American rugby union footballer
Jeremy Crawford, American game designer
Jermaine Crawford (born 1992), American actor
Jerry Crawford (born 1947), American baseball umpire
Jerry Crawford (lawyer) (born 1949), American lawyer and politician
Jesse Crawford (1895–1962), American pianist
Jessie Crawford (1828–1875), New Zealand barrack matron
Jim Crawford (disambiguation), multiple people
Joan Crawford (1905–1977), American actress
Joan Crawford (basketball) (born 1937), American basketball player
Joel Crawford (disambiguation), multiple people
Joey Crawford (born 1951), American basketball referee
John Crawford (disambiguation), multiple people
Johnny Crawford (1946–2021), American actor
Johnny Crawford (ice hockey) (1916–1973), Canadian ice hockey player
Johnson T. Crawford (1889–1955), American lawyer
Jonathan Crawford (born 1990), Scottish footballer
Jonathon Crawford (born 1991), American baseball player
Jordan Crawford (born 1988), American basketball player
Joseph Crawford (disambiguation), multiple people
Josephine Crawford (1878–1952), American painter
J. P. Crawford (born 1995), American baseball player
Judy Crawford (born 1951), Canadian skier
Justann Crawford (born 1973), Australian boxer
Justin Crawford (disambiguation), multiple people

K
Kamie Crawford (born 1992), American television host
Kate Crawford, Australian writer
Katherine Crawford (disambiguation), multiple people
Kathryn Crawford (1908–1980), American actress
Kathy Crawford (born 1942), American author and politician
Katy Crawford (born 1987), American musician
Kay Teer Crawford (1914–2001), American entrepreneur
Keith Crawford (born 1970), American football player
Kellie Crawford (born 1974), Australian singer and actress
Ken Crawford (disambiguation), multiple people
Kenneth Crawford (1895–1961), British army officer
Kevin Crawford, Irish musician
Kevin Crawford (scholar) (1970–2013), American scholar
Kieran Crawford (born 1983), Welsh rugby union footballer
Kizzy Crawford (born 1996), Welsh singer
Kristopher Crawford, American physician and politician
Kutter Crawford (born 1996), American baseball player

L
Lady Margaret Crawford, Scottish social figure
Larry Crawford (born 1959), American football player
Larry Crawford (baseball) (1914–1994), American baseball player
Latice Crawford (born 1982), American singer
Lavell Crawford (born 1968), American comedian
Lawrence Crawford (soldier) (1611–1645), Scottish soldier
Lawrence Crawford (mathematician) (1867–1951), Scottish mathematician
Lavell Crawford (born 1968), American comedian
Leanna Crawford, American singer-songwriter
Lectured Crawford (1842–1901), American minister
Leigh Crawford (born 1946), Australian rules footballer
Leland D. Crawford (1930–1993), American Marine officer
Leo Crawford (1903–1973), Irish trade unionist
Lester Crawford (born 1939), American politician
Lilla Crawford (born 2000/2001), American actress
Linval Crawford (1959–1992), Jamaican cricketer
Lorin Crawford, American professor
Lou Crawford (born 1962), Canadian ice hockey player
Louise Crawford (born 1978), Australian actress
Louisa Crawford (1789–1857), English songwriter
Lynn Crawford (born 1964), Canadian chef

M
Mairtín Crawford (1967–2004), Northern Irish poet
Marc Crawford (born 1961), Canadian ice hockey player and coach
Maria Crawford (born 1939), American geologist
Marion Crawford (1909–1988), Scottish educator
Marjorie Cox Crawford (1903–1983), Australian tennis player
Mark Crawford (born 1989), American football player
Mark Crawford (playwright), Canadian playwright
Markel Crawford (born 1994), American basketball player
Marta Crawford (born 1968), Portuguese psychologist
Martha Foster Crawford (1830–1909), American writer
Martin Crawford, British author
Martin Jenkins Crawford (1820–1883), American politician
Marvin Crawford (1932–2004), American skier
Mary Crawford (disambiguation), multiple people
Matilda Maranda Crawford (1844–1920), American-Canadian newspaper correspondent
Matt Crawford (born 1980), American soccer player
Matthew Crawford (born 1965), American writer
Max Crawford (1906–1991), Australian historian
Max Crawford (writer) (1938–2010), American writer
Medorem Crawford (1819–1891), American soldier
Melba Crawford, American academic administrator
Michael Crawford (disambiguation), multiple people
Mike Crawford (born 1974), American football player
Morris B. Crawford (1852–1940), American physics professor
Mush Crawford (1898–1966), American football player

N
Narvel J. Crawford (born 1929), American politician
Natalie Crawford, American operations researcher and defense analyst
Nathan Crawford (born 1986), Australian baseball player
Neil Crawford (disambiguation), multiple people
Nick Crawford (born 1990), Canadian ice hockey player
Nicola Crawford (born 1971), English rugby union footballer
Nigel Crawford (born 1979), Irish Gaelic footballer
Noah Crawford (born 1994), American actor

O
O. G. S. Crawford (1886–1957), English archaeologist
Oliver Crawford (1917–2008), American screenwriter

P
Pamela Crawford (1921–1997), Australian artist
Pat Crawford (disambiguation), multiple people
Patricia Crawford (1928–2008), American politician
Patricia Marcia Crawford (1941–2009), Australian historian
Patrick Crawford (1933–2009), British army medical officer
Patrick Crawford (soldier) (??–1614), Scottish soldier
Paul Crawford (disambiguation), multiple people
Paxton Crawford (born 1977), American baseball player
Percy Crawford (1902–1960), American evangelist
Perry O. Crawford Jr. (1917–2006), American computer scientist
Peter Crawford (disambiguation), multiple people
Phyllis Crawford (1899–1980), American writer
Purdy Crawford (1931–2014), Canadian lawyer

Q
Quinton Crawford (born 1990), American basketball coach

R
Rachael Crawford (born 1969), Canadian actress
Ralston Crawford (1906–1978), American artist
Randy Crawford (born 1952), American singer
Ray Crawford (1915–1996), American test pilot
Ray Crawford (footballer) (born 1936), English footballer
Reed Crawford (1924–2006), British milliner
Reginald Crawford (disambiguation), multiple people
Rex Crawford (1932–2022), Canadian politician
Richard Crawford (disambiguation), multiple people
Rick Crawford (disambiguation), multiple people
Robbie Crawford (disambiguation), multiple people
Robert Crawford (disambiguation), multiple people
Roberta Dodd Crawford (1897–1954), American soprano
Robyn Crawford (born 1960), American author
Roger Crawford (disambiguation), multiple people
Ron Crawford (born 1945), American actor
Ronald Crawford (disambiguation), multiple people
Rosanna Crawford (born 1988), Canadian biathlete
Rowland Crawford (1902–1973), American architect
Roy Crawford (1948/1949–2016), Northern Irish academic administrator
Roy Crawford (cricketer) (1917–1996), New Zealand cricketer
Rufus Crawford (born 1955), American football player

S
Sadie Crawford (1885–1965), British-American performer
Samantha Crawford (born 1995), American tennis player
Samuel Crawford (disambiguation), multiple people
Sara Crawford (1876–1949), American politician
Sarah Crawford (politician), American politician
Sarah-Jane Crawford, English television presenter
Sax Crawford (1881–1964), American football player
Seymour Crawford (1944–2018), Irish politician
Shag Crawford (1916–2007), American baseball umpire
Shane Crawford (born 1974), Australian rules footballer
Shane Crawford (soccer) (born 1979), Jamaican footballer
Shannon Crawford (born 1963), Canadian rower
Shawn Crawford (born 1978), American sprinter
Shep Crawford (born 1970), American musician
Sidney Crawford (1885–1968), South Australian businessman
Sidney Crawford (footballer) (1887–1979), Scottish footballer
Sidnie White Crawford (born 1960), American professor
Sonya Crawford, American journalist
Sophia Crawford (born 1966), English actress
Stanley Crawford (born 1937), American writer
Stanton Crawford (1897–1966), American academic administrator
Steven Crawford (disambiguation), multiple people
Stewart Crawford (1913–2002), British diplomat
Stevie Crawford (born 1974), Scottish footballer
Stuart Crawford (born 1981), Scottish squash player
Sue Crawford (born 1967), American politician
Susan Crawford (disambiguation), multiple people

T
Tad Crawford (born 1984), Canadian football player
Tammy Crawford (born 1974), Canadian footballer
Tarleton Perry Crawford (1921–1902), American missionary
Terence Crawford (born 1987), American boxer
Terence Crawford (actor), Australian actor
Terrayne Crawford (born 1945), American actress
Terri Crawford, Canadian musician
Theo Crawford (1911–1993), British pathologist
Therese Crawford (born 1976), American volleyball player
Thom Crawford, Australian singer-songwriter
Thomas Crawford (disambiguation), multiple people
Tom Crawford (disambiguation), multiple people
Tracey Crawford (born 1970), British radio presenter
Tristan Crawford (born 1982), American-Australian baseball player
Truman Crawford (1934–2003), American music arranger
T. Stephen Crawford (1900–1987), American chemical engineer
Tyrone Crawford (born 1989), Canadian football player

V
Vernon Crawford (born 1974), American football player
Vernon D. Crawford (1919–1994), Canadian professor
Victoria Crawford (born 1986), American model and professional wrestler
Victor Crawford (1932–1996), American politician and lawyer
Vincent Crawford (born 1950), American economist
Virginia Mary Crawford (1862–1948), British suffragist
Vivian Crawford (1879–1922), English cricketer

W
Walt Crawford, American writer
Walter Crawford (1894–1978), Australian cricketer
Wayne Crawford (1947–2016), American actor
Wesley Crawford (1901–1961), American raceway driver
Wilf Crawford (1915–1993), Scottish rugby union footballer
William Crawford (disambiguation), multiple people
Willie Crawford (1946–2004), American baseball player

X
Xavier Crawford (born 1995), American football player

Y
Yunaika Crawford (born 1982), Cuban hammer thrower

People with the given name Crawford
Crawford Allan (born 1967), Scottish football referee
Crawford Anderson (1848–1930), New Zealand politician
Crawford Ashley (born 1964), English boxer
Crawford Baptie (born 1959), Scottish footballer
Crawford Barton (1943–1994), American photographer
Crawford Blagden (1881–1937), American football player
Crawford Beveridge, Scottish businessman
Crawford Boyd (born 1952), Scottish footballer
Crawford Chamberlain (1821–1902), British-Indian Army officer
Crawford Dunn (1918–1980), American game designer
Crawford Fairbrother (1936–1986), Scottish high jumper
Crawford Findlay (1871–??), Scottish rugby union footballer
Crawford Gates (1921–2018), American composer
Crawford Goldsby (1876–1896), American outlaw
Crawford Gordon Jr. (1914–1967), Canadian industrialist
Crawford Greene (1884–1959), English politician
Crawford Greenewalt (1902–1993), American chemical engineer
Crawford Hallock Greenewalt Jr. (1937–2012), American archaeologist
Crawford Grimsley (born 1967), American boxer
Crawford Henry (born 1937), American tennis player
Crawford Ker (born 1962), American football player
Crawford Kerr (1902–1950), British athlete
Crawford Kilian (born 1941), Canadian novelist
Crawford Logan, British actor
Crawford Long (1815–1878), American surgeon
Crawford Nalder (1910–1994), Australian politician
Crawford Martin (1916–1972), American politician
Crawford McCullagh (1868–1948), Irish politician
Crawford Merkel (1906–1987), American bobsledder
Crawford Mims (1933–2001), American football player
Crawford Mitchell (1908–1976), Northern Irish artist
Crawford Palmer (born 1970), American basketball player
Crawford F. Parker (1906–1986), American politician
Crawford Pasco (1818–1898), Australian naval officer
Crawford Somerset (1895–1968), New Zealand teacher
Crawford Symonds (1915–2000), Australian cricketer
Crawford R. Thoburn (1862–1899), American missionary
Crawford Howell Toy (1836–1919), American scholar
Crawford Vaughan (1874–1947), Australian politician
Crawford Wethington (1904–1994), American musician
Crawford Wilson (born 1989), American actor
Crawford Young, American musician

Fictional characters
Lana Crawford, in the soap opera Neighbours
Stella Crawford, in the soap opera EastEnders

See also
Earl of Crawford, title of Scottish nobility created in 1398
Clan Crawford, Scottish clan
Crawford (disambiguation), other things named Crawford
Governor Crawford (disambiguation), a disambiguation page for governors surnamed "Crawford"
Justice Crawford (disambiguation), a disambiguation page for justices surnamed "Crawford"
Senator Crawford (disambiguation), a disambiguation page for senators surnamed "Crawford"

Notes

Citations

References

English-language surnames
English toponymic surnames
Scottish toponymic surnames
Surnames of Ulster-Scottish origin